The 1960–61 Bulgarian Cup was the 21st season of the Bulgarian Cup (in this period the tournament was named Cup of the Soviet Army). CSKA Sofia won the competition, beating Spartak Varna 3–0 in the final at the Vasil Levski National Stadium.

First round

|}

Second round
Pirin Blagoevgrad were given bye into the quarterfinals as both possible opponents were kicked out of the tournament in the previous round.  

|}

Quarter-finals

|}

Semi-finals

|}

Final

Details

References

1960-61
1960–61 domestic association football cups
Cup